The Kandy Airport is a proposed domestic airport in the central city of Kandy in Kundasale, Sri Lanka, aimed at facilitating growth in the influx of tourists to the Central Province. Domestic operations from Bandaranaike International Airport in Colombo are set begin with the new domestic carrier Cinnamon Air. The development is part of a multi-million dollar scheme to rebrand Kandy as a city of global cultural importance.

Location
Proposed areas for construction were explored in December 2011, with State Minister of Foreign Employment Promotion and Market Diversification Priyankara Jayaratne and Minister of Health Keheliya Rambukwella inspecting three possible sites: a 42-acre block of land of belonging to the Department of Agriculture, a 1,250 acre farmland belonging to the Peradeniya University, and a 250-acre block at Ambakote belonging to the Mahaweli Authority. A post-inspection media statement indicated that construction work would commence subsequent to the receipt of technical reports on the sites. On 5 August 2012, it was announced that Kundasale would most likely be the final location.

In August 2018, the Cabinet of Ministers in Sri Lanka has given its approval to conduct a feasibility study to construct a domestic airport in Maberiyathenna, Digana in Kandy district.

See also
Cinnamon Air
Kandy
List of airports in Sri Lanka

References

Airports in Sri Lanka
Buildings and structures in Kandy District